Celebridades is a CD of collection that included Paulina Rubio's best hits and live presentation, it was released as CD. and DVD. in March 25, 2008.

CD

DVD

References

Paulina Rubio albums
2008 video albums
2008 greatest hits albums
Music video compilation albums